"Forever and Ever" is a song by Greek singer-songwriter Demis Roussos from his second studio album, Forever and Ever (1973).

The song was included on Roussos' 1976 EP The Roussos Phenomenon, which reached no.1 in the UK.

Background and writing 
The song was written by Alec R. Costandinos and Stélios Vlavianós. The recording was produced by Demis Roussos.

There is also a Spanish-language version, titled "Eternamente".

Commercial performance 
The song reached no. 1 in Belgium (Flanders) and no. 2 in the Netherlands.

Track listing and formats 

 French 7-inch single

A. "Forever and Ever" – 3:42
B. "Velvet Mornings" – 3:38

Credits and personnel 

 Demis Roussos – producer, vocals
 Alec R. Costandinos – songwriter
 Stélios Vlavianós – songwriter, arranger
 Bernard Leloup – cover art, photographer
 Roger Roche – engineering
 Didier Pitois – engineering

Credits and personnel adopted from the Forever and Ever album and 7-inch single liner notes.

Charts

See also 

 List of number-one hits of 1973 (Mexico)

References 

1973 songs
1973 singles
Demis Roussos songs
Philips Records singles
Song recordings produced by Demis Roussos
Songs written by Alec R. Costandinos
Songs written by Stélios Vlavianós
Ultratop 50 Singles (Flanders) number-one singles
Ultratop 50 Singles (Wallonia) number-one singles